Rosslyn is a coastal town and locality in the Livingstone Shire, Queensland, Australia.

Geography 
Historically, the town of Rosslyn developed along the beaches on either side of Statue Rock, a headland into the Coral Sea. However, when locality boundaries were formalised, Statue Rock was placed on the boundary of the locality of Lammermoor to the west and the locality of Rosslyn to the east.

The northern boundary of the locality is coastal commencing at Statue Rock along the beach at Statue Bay (where the residential development is located) to Rosslyn Head (where the Rosslyn Bay Boat Harbour has been developed). The eastern boundary of the locality is also coastal, commencing at Rosslyn Head, along Kemp Beach to Bluff Point.

The Scenic Highway runs from south to north-west through the locality.

Most of the land in the locality is undeveloped. The Rosslyn Head area is mostly reserved as the Capricorn Coast National Park, apart from the marina and a resort. Bluff Point is also part of the national park. Most of the inland parts of the locality remain Crown land under the control of the Queensland Government.

History

Education 
There are no schools in Rosslyn. The nearest government primary school is Taranganba State School in Taranganba to the north-west. The nearest government secondary school is Yeppoon State High School in Yeppoon to the north-west.

Amenities 

There are a number of parks in the area:

 Discovery Cresent Park
 Mulambin Beach Nature  Park

 Kemp Beach Park

Keppel Bay Marina is a  marina.

There are a number of boat ramps in the locality, all managed by the Department of Transport and Main Roads:

 Anchor Drive (eastern) into Rosslyn Bay State Boat Harbour
 Breakwater Drive (western) into Rosslyn Bay State Boat Harbour

There are a number of jetties in the locality, all managed by the Department of Transport and Main Roads:

 Vin. E. Jones Drive in the north-east corner of  Rosslyn Bay State Boat Harbour

 Rosslyn Bay Commercial Jetty #1 in the north-east corner of the harbour

 Rosslyn Bay Commercial Jetty #2 in the north-east corner of the harbour

 Rosslyn Bay Lay-up Maintenance Jetty in the north-east corner of the harbour, near wall moorings

References

External links 

 

Towns in Queensland
Shire of Livingstone
Capricorn Coast
Localities in Queensland